The 1938 Texas Tech Red Raiders football team represented Texas Technological College—now known as Texas Tech University—as a member of the Border Conference during the 1938 college football season. Led by nithh-year head coach, the Red Raiders compiled an overall record of 10–1 with a mark of 2–0 in conference play. They did not play enough conference games to qualify for the Border Conference championship. Texas Tech was invited to the Cotton Bowl Classic, where they lost to Saint Mary's. The team played home games at Tech Field in Lubbock, Texas.

Schedule

References

Texas Tech
Texas Tech Red Raiders football seasons
Texas Tech Red Raiders football